1902 in philosophy

Events 
  The 1902 Nobel Prize in Literature was awarded to Theodor Mommsen, "the greatest living master of the art of historical writing, with special reference to his monumental work, A history of Rome".

Publications 
 Pierre-Simon Laplace, A Philosophical Essay on Probabilities (English translation: 1902)
 William James, The Varieties of Religious Experience (1902)
 Benedetto Croce, Aesthetic as Science of Expression and General Linguistic (1902)
 Peter Kropotkin, Mutual Aid: A Factor of Evolution (1902)

Births 
 July 28 - Karl Popper (died 1994)
 December 28 - Mortimer J. Adler (died 2001)

Deaths

References 

Philosophy
20th-century philosophy
Philosophy by year